Luc Franco (born 30 December 1998) is a Spanish international-French rugby league footballer currently playing for Limoux Grizzlies in the Elite One Championship. He previously played for AS Carcassonne, Villeneuve Minervois XIII and Limoux Grizzlies.

References

External links
Luc Franco Thirteen World profile

1998 births
Living people
AS Carcassonne players
French people of Spanish descent
French rugby league players
Limoux Grizzlies players
Racing Club Albi XIII players
Rugby league fullbacks
Spain national rugby league team players